Roderick Demond Myers (born January 14, 1973) is a former professional outfielder. He currently owns KC Elite Athletics consulting and training.

Sources

1973 births
Living people
African-American baseball players
American expatriate baseball players in Mexico
Appleton Foxes players
Baseball City Royals players
Baseball players from Texas
Charlotte Knights players
Gulf Coast Royals players
Kansas City Royals players
Major League Baseball outfielders
Mexican League baseball center fielders
Omaha Royals players
People from Conroe, Texas
Rockford Royals players
San Antonio Missions players
Springfield/Ozark Mountain Ducks players
Sultanes de Monterrey players
Wichita Wranglers players
Wilmington Blue Rocks players
Winston-Salem Warthogs players
21st-century African-American sportspeople
20th-century African-American sportspeople
Conroe High School alumni